The 1973 Tennessee Volunteers football team (variously "Tennessee", "UT" or the "Vols") represented the University of Tennessee in the 1973 NCAA Division I football season. Playing as a member of the Southeastern Conference (SEC), the team was led by head coach Bill Battle, in his fourth year, and played their home games at Neyland Stadium in Knoxville, Tennessee. They finished the season with a record of eight wins and four losses (8–4 overall, 3–3 in the SEC) and a loss to Texas Tech in the 1973 Gator Bowl.

Schedule

Roster

Game summaries

Army

Condredge Holloway set up Tennessee touchdowns with a 52-yard pass and a 48-yard run as Tennessee won its second straight while Army dropped its third consecutive season opener. Holloway fumbled at his own 12 on the second play of the game, which set up an Army field goal. The slippery QB came back to engineer two first-quarter field goals by Ricky Townsend. Midway through the second period, Holloway evaded the rush and found Emmon Love for a nine-yard gain to the 33. On the next play, he found Stanley Morgan deep down the left sideline for a long bomb to the Army 15.

Draft picks

References

Tennessee
Tennessee Volunteers football seasons
Tennessee Volunteers football